Eden Studios, Inc. is an American role-playing game publisher founded in 1996 by George Vasilakos, M. Alexander Jurkat, and Ed Healy. Currently run by Mr. Vasilakos, Eden Studios is best known for Conspiracy X, the Buffyverse role-playing games, All Flesh Must Be Eaten, CJ Carella's WitchCraft and most recently for the City of Heroes Roleplaying Game, an unreleased adaptation of Cryptic Studios' MMORPG City of Heroes. Although there has been no activity or news from the company in over a year, with their Facebook page's last post in November 2020. It is unknown at this time if the company is active.

Games
 Abduction: The Card Game
 Adventure Maximus
 All Flesh Must Be Eaten
 Angel (Origins Award winner for Roleplaying Game of 2003) and Buffy: The Vampire Slayer
 Armageddon: The End Times
 Army of Darkness
 Beyond Human
 Conspiracy X
 Eden Studios Presents (Unisystem)
 Ghosts of Albion Roleplaying Game, based on the Ghosts of Albion property
 Hack!
 Odyssey (d20 system)
 Rail Empires: Iron Dragon
 Terra Primate
 CJ Carella's WitchCraft

Books 
 Prometheus Unwound, Matt Forbeck (Origins Award winner for Best Game Related Short Work 2001)
 Book of Final Flesh (Origins Award winner for Long Fiction 2003)

Eden Studios released Enemies Archived (2006), a monster manual for Armageddon in PDF and POD produced in conjunction with Misfit Studios.

See also 
 Unisystem, the role-playing game system used in many Eden Studios RPGs

References

External links 
 Eden Studios official website
 Ed Healy recounts birth of Eden Studios
 Interview with M. Alexander Jurkat founding owner of Eden Studios

Role-playing game publishing companies